Julio César Landauri Ventura  (born March 17, 1986) in Callao is a Peruvian football striker, who currently plays for Alianza Universidad in the Torneo Descentralizado.

International career
Landauri was named in Peru's provisional squad for Copa América Centenario but was cut from the final squad.

Teams

Titles won

References

External links

1986 births
Living people
Sportspeople from Callao
Peruvian footballers
Sport Boys footballers
Club Universitario de Deportes footballers
FC Brașov (1936) players
Total Chalaco footballers
Ayacucho FC footballers
Club Deportivo Universidad César Vallejo footballers
Club Alianza Lima footballers
Peruvian Primera División players
Liga I players
Peruvian expatriate footballers
Expatriate footballers in Romania
Peruvian expatriate sportspeople in Romania
Association football midfielders